Farzin Asadi (Persian: فرزین اسدی) (born 17 January 1993) is an Iranian professional sprint kayaker. His best results were Bronze at 2010 Guangzhou China Asian Games in K-4 1000m, Gold in K-1 1000m Asian championship 2011 Tehran, Gold in K-4 1000m 2014 Asian Games in Uzbekistan, and Silver in K-2 2017 Asian Canoe Sprint Championships.

References 

 

1993 births
Living people
Canoeists at the 2010 Asian Games
Canoeists at the 2014 Asian Games
Medalists at the 2010 Asian Games
Asian Games medalists in canoeing
Asian Games bronze medalists for Iran
Iranian male canoeists